Chernihivskyi Raion may refer to:

Ukraine 
Chernihiv Raion, a raion  of Chernihiv Oblast:
Chernihivka Raion,  a raion of Zaporizhia Oblast.

Russia 
Chernigovsky District (Chernigovsky Raion), a raion in Primorsky Krai.